The Evangeliary of Averbode is an illuminated manuscript, an evangeliary created in the region of the Meuse river between 1150 and 1175. The manuscript is named after Averbode Abbey in Belgium where it was kept in the 18th century. It is considered one of the finest examples of illuminated manuscripts within Mosan art. It belongs to the collections of the library of the University of Liège.

Description
The manuscript page size is 27.7 x 19.2 cm. It has 173 pages. It is in the collection of the library of the University of Liège. It contains eight richly decorated full-page miniatures, and has been described as a masterpiece of Mosan art. Its binding is from the 20th century. It is formally classified as a part of the historical heritage of Wallonia.

History

The manuscript was produced between 1150 et 1175. It is named after the Averbode Abbey, where the manuscript was kept in the 18th century. The earlier fate of the manuscript is unknown, and it is not certain that it was commissioned for Averbode Abbey. Its calendar contains the names of several saints particularly venerated in the area. The book was created in a time that the production of luxury evangeliaries decreased because liturgical Gospel readings were increasingly incorporated into Missals. Evangeliaries became increasingly of less importance in the art of Western Europe. This evangeliary is an exception to this trend. The book was donated to the University of Liège in 1821, after having been removed from Averbode Abbey before its suppression in 1796.

References

External links
The Evangeliary of Averbode, completely digitised in the collections of Liège University Library (in French)

Christian illuminated manuscripts
12th-century illuminated manuscripts
Mosan art
University of Liège